Vågan is a municipality in Nordland county, Norway. It is part of the traditional district of Lofoten. The administrative centre of the municipality is the town of Svolvær. Some of the villages in Vågan include Digermulen, Gimsøysand, Gravermarka, Henningsvær, Hopen, Kabelvåg, Kleppstad, Laupstad, Liland, Skrova, Straumnes, and Sydalen.

The  municipality is the 210th largest by area out of the 356 municipalities in Norway. Vågan is the 115th most populous municipality in Norway with a population of 9,724.

General information
Vågan was established as a municipality on 1 January 1838 (see formannskapsdistrikt law). In 1856, the northwestern part of Vågan Municipality (population: 987) was separated to form the new Gimsøy Municipality. On 1 July 1918, the town of Svolvær (population: 2,429) was separated to form its own municipality. This left Vågan with 3,399 residents. During the 1960s, there were many municipal mergers across Norway due to the work of the Schei Committee. On 1 January 1964, the municipalities of Gimsøy (population: 1,551), Svolvær (population: 3,952), and Vågan (population: 4,820) were merged to form the new, larger municipality of Vågan.

Name
The municipality (originally the parish) is named after the old Vågan farm (Old Norse: Vágar), since the first Vågan Church was built there. The name is the plural form of vág which means "bay". The island of Austvågøya (Old Norse: Vágøy) was named after this important site (which later led the neighboring island to be named Vestvågøya). The name was historically spelled Vaagan.

Coat of arms
The coat of arms was granted on 30 March 1973. The official blazon is "Azure, a cod embowed argent". This means the arms have a blue field (background) and the charge is a cod. The cod has a tincture of argent which means it is commonly colored white, but if it is made out of metal, then silver is used. The blue color in the field and the code were chosen because fishing is the main source of income for the municipality. The arms were designed by Hallvard Traetteberg, basing them off the old arms for the town of Svolvær which was merged into Vågan in 1964.

Churches
The Church of Norway has five parishes within the municipality of Vågan. It is part of the Lofoten prosti (deanery) in the Diocese of Sør-Hålogaland.

Geography
The main population centres are the town of Svolvær and the villages of Kabelvåg and Henningsvær, located on the largest island, Austvågøya (although Svolvær and Henningsvær are partly located on smaller islands adjacent to the main island). All three have a picturesque situation under the rugged Lofoten mountains, facing the rough body of water called Vestfjorden. Vågan municipality includes over half of Austvågøya island, all of the islands of Gimsøya, Skrova, Stormolla, Litlmolla, numerous other tiny islets, plus the southwestern tip of the island of Hinnøya. The Moholmen Lighthouse and Skrova Lighthouse are both located in the Vestfjorden. Two notable mountains in the municipality are Higravstinden and Svolværgeita. Other mountains include Fløyfjellet, Trakta, and Vågakallen.

Climate
Skrova near Svolvær has a temperate climate (marine west coast) in the 1991-2020 period.

Government
All municipalities in Norway, including Vågan, are responsible for primary education (through 10th grade), outpatient health services, senior citizen services, unemployment and other social services, zoning, economic development, and municipal roads. The municipality is governed by a municipal council of elected representatives, which in turn elect a mayor.  The municipality falls under the Lofoten District Court and the Hålogaland Court of Appeal.

Municipal council
The municipal council of Vågan is made up of 29 representatives that are elected to four year terms. The party breakdown of the council is as follows:

Mayor
The mayors of Vågan (incomplete list):
2019–present:  Frank Johnsen (Sp) 
2011-2019: Eivind Holst (H)
1999-2011: Hugo Bjørnstad (Ap)
1983-1995: Steinar Molvik (Ap)
1911-1913: Jonas Pedersen (V)

History and economy

Kabelvåg is the oldest fishing village in Lofoten, where King Øystein built the first fishing shacks in the early 12th century. The Lofoten Cathedral, built in 1898, seats 1,200 people, and used to be filled to the last seat during the Lofoten fishing in the winter.

Henningsvær has a picturesque situation on several islands, and is today more important for fishing. Svolvær is the municipal centre, and has an impressive number of artists' studios and galleries. In addition to the cod fisheries, salmon fish farming and tourism are economically important in Vågan.

Transportation
The islands that make up Vågan are connected by several different bridges. The European route E10 highway connects the neighboring municipality of Vestvågøy to Vågan (Gimsøya island) by the Sundklakkstraumen Bridge. Gimsøya island connects to Austvågøya island by the Gimsøystraumen Bridge. The islands of Henningsvær are connected to Austvågøya by the Henningsvær Bridges. The rest of the small islands are only accessible by boats and ferries. In the town of Svolvær, the Svinøy Bridge connects the main part of town to the island of Svinøya. Svolvær Airport, Helle is located just east of the town of Svolvær.

Sister cities
  Ancona, Italy

Notable people 

 Eystein I of Norway (ca.1088–1123) King of Norway, 1103 to 1123; founded Vågan
 Paul Egede (1708 in Kabelvåg – 1789) a Dano-Norwegian theologian, scholar and Lutheran missionionary to the Kalaallit people in Greenland
 Niels Rasch Egede (1710 in Vågan – 1782) a Danish-Norwegian merchant and Lutheran missionary in Greenland
 Gunnar Berg (1863 on Svinøya – 1893) painted the everyday life of local fishermen in Lofoten
 Martin Hoff Ekroll (1865 in Skroven – 1916) a merchant, mountaineer and Arctic explorer
 Erna Schøyen (born 1887 in Kabelvåg – 1968) a Norwegian actress 
 Gisken Wildenvey (1892 at Austvågøy – 1985) a novelist and author of short stories 
 Soffi Schønning (1895 in Kabelvåg – 1994) a Norwegian operatic soprano 
 Ellen Einan (1931 in Svolvær – 2013) a Norwegian poet and illustrator
 Dagfinn Bakke (1933–2019 in Svolvær) a Norwegian painter, illustrator and printmaker
 Hans Christian Alsvik (1936 in Svolvær – 2011) a Norwegian television presenter
 Jack Berntsen (1940–2010) a philologist, songwriter and folk singer; lived in Svolvær from 1968
 Inger Johanne Grytting (born 1949 in Svolvær) an artist, lives and works in New York City
 Maryon Eilertsen (1950 in Svolvær – 2015) a Norwegian actress and theatre director  
 Kari Bremnes (born 1956 in Svolvær) a Norwegian singer and songwriter
 Marit Andreassen (born 1966 in Svolvær) a Norwegian actress 
 Maria Strømme (born 1970 in Svolvær) a physicist and academic who lives and works in Sweden

Sport 
 Terje Hanssen (born 1948 in Kabelvåg) a former biathlete, competed at the 1976 Winter Olympics 
 Ørjan Løvdal (born 1962 in Svolvær) a Norwegian ice hockey player and coach
 Cato André Hansen (born 1972 in Strauman) a football coach and former player with 234 caps for FK Bodø/Glimt
 Stig Johansen (born 1972 in Kabelvåg) a former footballer with 305 club caps and 3 for Norway

Gallery

References

External links

Municipal fact sheet from Statistics Norway 
Lofoten Golf Links Golf court at Gimsøy in Vågan
Laukvikøyene nature reserve, a wetland area with rich bird life 
Polarlightcenter

 
Municipalities of Nordland
Populated places of Arctic Norway
1838 establishments in Norway